Faxe or Fakse is a town on the island of Zealand in eastern Denmark. It is located in Faxe Municipality in Region Zealand. The town is most known for the Faxe Brewery, Royal Unibrew, a relatively large brewery producing a range of beer and soft drinks, soda, energy drinks, Faxe Kondi and many more and so on. On the edge of town lies a big limestone quarry (1 km2), Faxe Quarry owned by Faxe Kalk, The Faxe Quarry have had their own narrow track railway but it was shut down many years ago owned by Faxe Kalk. A Haribo Licorice (“Haribo Lakrids A/S”) factory was also founded in Faxe in 1935.

History
The name Faxe is Old Norse and means "horse mane", probably a reference to its location on a long hill. The town is mentioned in 1280. The first church was built in 1440.

For many years the letter x was considered unnatural in Danish and the Fakse spelling was enforced instead of the Old Norse Faxe. When hyphenated, the x still splits into ks (Fak-se).

A narrow gauge railway line opened between the quarry and The Harbor in Faxe Ladeplads in 1865 and to The Faxe Ladeplads Harbor in Faxe Ladeplads. The Østbanen railway line opened in 1879.
The Faxe Quarry have had their own narrow track railway but it was shut down many years ago. And one of The trains from narrow gauge railway line between The Faxe Quarry to The Harbor in Faxe Ladeplads, is located in Faxe mini by, that is the only and the last train between and from The narrow gauge railway line between The Faxe Qurry and The Harbor in Faxe Ladeplads, Fakse Ladeplads.

Landmarks
Faxe Church is from the late 15th century. The half-timbered Rasmus Svendsens Skole from 1633 is Denmark's oldest still existing village school. The Jomfruens Egede estate traces its history to 1346.

Notable people 

 Joachim Neergaard (1877 in Stubberup – 1920) a Danish composer.
 Gunnar Andreasen (1914 in Faxe – 1996) a Danish boxer, competed in the 1936 Summer Olympics
 Ib Nielsen (born 1926 in Faxe) a Danish rower, competed at the 1948 Summer Olympics 
 Knud Nielsen (born 1936 in Faxe) a Danish rower, competed at the 1960 and 1964 Summer Olympics
 Jens Berendt Jensen (born 1940 in Faxe) a Danish rower, competed at the 1960 and 1964 Summer Olympics
 Sven Lysholt Hansen (born 1945 in Faxe) a Danish rower, competed in the 1960 Summer Olympics
 Niels Olsen (born 1948 in Faxe) a Danish rower, competed at the 1964 Summer Olympics
 Jesper Olsen (born 1961 in Faxe) a Danish former footballer with 402 club caps and 43 for Denmark 
 Michael Maze (born 1981 in Faxe) a professional table tennis player

Gallery

See also
Dalby, Faxe Municipality
Faxe Ladeplads
Haslev
Karise
Rønnede

References

 Municipal statistics: NetBorger Kommunefakta, delivered from KMD aka Kommunedata (Municipal Data)
 Municipal mergers and neighbors: Eniro new municipalities map

External links
 The new Faxe municipality's official website 

Cities and towns in Region Zealand
Former municipalities of Denmark
Faxe Municipality